William Hay, 5th Earl of Erroll  ( –  28 July 1522) was a Scottish peer and statesman.

Biography

William Hay was the son of the William Hay, 4th Earl of Erroll and Christian Lyon. He had double royal lineage, descended from Kings Robert II of Scotland and James I of Scotland.

He inherited the earldom on 20 October 1513, aged approximately 18. In his role as Lord High Constable of Scotland, the young earl was sent as a commissioner to France in 1515 and to England in 1516.

Marriage and issue

William Hay married Elizabeth Ruthven, youngest daughter of William Ruthven, 1st Lord Ruthven by his second wife, Christian Forbes, and had one son by her:

William Hay, 6th Earl of Erroll (1521 – 11 April 1541)

He died on 28 July 1522, not yet 30 years old. As his son William died under 21 years of age, the lands of Errol, Perthshire were held by the Crown, until the end of 1541, when the title was inherited by George Hay, the grandson of William Hay, 3rd Earl of Erroll.

Ancestry

References

 

1495 births
1522 deaths
05
William, 05
15th-century Scottish people
16th-century Scottish people
Scottish diplomats